The 2020 Supercopa Ecuador was the first edition of the Supercopa Ecuador, Ecuador's football super cup. It was held on 1 February 2020 between 2019 Ecuadorian Serie A champions Delfín and 2019 Copa Ecuador champions LDU Quito, being the third final in a row played between both sides after the final series of both the league and the cup. It was also the first time VAR was implemented in Ecuadorian football.

The match was played at Estadio Christian Benítez Betancourt in Guayaquil. Originally it was scheduled to be played at Estadio Monumental Isidro Romero Carbo, however, the venue was switched due to the latter stadium hosting the return leg of Barcelona's Copa Libertadores first stage tie against Uruguayan club Progreso on 29 January.

LDU Quito were the winners, beating Delfín 5–4 on penalties following a 1–1 draw after 90 minutes.

Teams

Match

References

2020 in Ecuadorian football